Irene Bosch is a Venezuelan biologist and researcher graduated from the Central University of Venezuela with two doctorates from Harvard University in molecular biology and tropical medicine, with extensive experience in research on dengue, zika and chikungunya.

By 2012, she developed rapid tests to detect these mosquito-borne diseases, creating the rapid test for dengue fever, on sale in Colombia, and the device for zika and chikungunya, which also allows early detection of the diseases.

In 2018, Bosch founded with a group of scientists and Lee Gehrke, a professor at Harvard University and MIT, E25Bio, a company dedicated to making rapid tests for infectious diseases. By 2020, the group created a rapid test for diagnosing virus diseases aimed at helping to contain the spread of COVID-19: the Dart Direct Antigen Rapid Test.

References 

Venezuelan biologists
Harvard University alumni
Central University of Venezuela alumni
COVID-19 researchers
Living people
Year of birth missing (living people)
Place of birth missing (living people)
Women biologists
21st-century biologists
21st-century Venezuelan women scientists
21st-century Venezuelan scientists